Liolaemus zapallarensis is a species of lizard in the family Iguanidae.
It is endemic to Chile.

References

zapallarensis
Lizards of South America
Endemic fauna of Chile
Reptiles of Chile
Reptiles described in 1933
Taxonomy articles created by Polbot